San Kristobal is a railway station in Busturia, Basque Country, Spain. It is owned by Euskal Trenbide Sarea and operated by Euskotren. It lies on the Urdaibai line.

History 
The station opened, together with the rest of the -Pedernales extension of the Amorebieta-Gernika line, on 15 March 1893. The station building was used as a barracks during the Spanish Civil War, and was restored after the end of the hostilities. It was demolished in the 1990s due to its bad condition, and at the same time the station was rebuilt slightly to the north.

Services 
The station is served by Euskotren Trena line E4. It runs every 30 minutes (in each direction) during weekdays, and every hour during weekends.

References 

Euskotren Trena stations
Railway stations in Biscay
Railway stations in Spain opened in 1893